Prince Constantine Constantinovich of Russia (Константин Константинович; 1 January 1891 – 18 July 1918), nicknamed Kostya by the family, was the third son and fourth child of Grand Duke Constantine Constantinovich of Russia by his wife Grand Duchess Elizabeth Mavrikievna of Russia.

The Prince was a silent, shy person who fancied theatre and was educated in the Corps des Pages, a military academy in Saint Petersburg. He served in the army during the First World War. A priest who met him at the front, Hegumen Seraphim, wrote: "He was an extremely modest officer of the Guard of the Izmaylovsky Regiment, much beloved by officers and soldiers alike; along with them he was a brave soldier who distinguished himself. I personally remember seeing him in the trenches among the soldiers, risking his life."

After seeing the happiness of his two elder siblings, John and Tatiana, Konstantin was keen to start his own family. He was interested in the Tsar's eldest daughter, Olga, but was also drawn to Princess Elisabeth of Romania. Elisabeth's grandmother, the former Grand Duchess Maria Alexandrovna of Russia, wrote to her daughter, the Crown Princess Marie of Romania in 1911, saying, "The young Kostya is seized now with terror that she will be snatched away, as he says, before he has even made her acquaintance. The young man seems really quite nice, is much liked in his regiment, and they have really been very well brought up. This one is full of life...if you have nothing against this youth coming on a passing visit, will you telegraph to me." However, the request was denied on political grounds, as Prince John was married to Helen of Serbia, and Konstantin never did find the marriage he longed for.

In March 1918 he was exiled to the Urals by the Bolsheviks and murdered in a mineshaft near Alapayevsk, along with his brothers Prince John Constantinovich and Prince Igor Konstantinovich, his cousin Prince Vladimir Pavlovich Paley and other relatives and friends. His body was eventually buried in the Russian Orthodox Church cemetery in Beijing, which was destroyed in 1986 to build a park.

Ancestry

See also
Romanov sainthood

External links
 Childhood photo: 

1891 births
1918 deaths
Murdered Russian royalty
Princes of royal blood (Russia)
Victims of Red Terror in Soviet Russia
Executed people from Saint Petersburg
19th-century people from the Russian Empire
Executed royalty
Burials in Beijing